The Nongmaiching Ching, also known as the Selloi Langmai Ching, is a mountain in Imphal Valley, Manipur. It is a holy pilgrimage site for the Meitei people. In Meitei mythology and religion (Sanamahism), it is a sacred mountain and the abode of God Nongpok Ningthou and Goddess Panthoibi.
In Meitei folklore, the Nongmaiching is described as the hill that produces "the seven days of a week".

Etymology 
According to many scholars including Thomas Callan Hodson of the Cambridge University, the Meitei language term "Nongmaiching" is derived from the terms, "nong", "mai" and "ching". Nong means sun or rain, mai means face or "in front of", and ching means hill or mountain. So, "Nongmaiching" means "the hill that fronts the rain or sun".

According to Tarak Chandra Das of the Calcutta University, the term "Nongmaiching" is translated as "the hill which rises to the east of Imphal and which is the scene of a rain-compelling ceremony."

The terms "Nongmaiching" and "Nongmaijing" are interchangeably used.

The term "Nongmaijing" may also mean Sunday in Meitei language (officially called Manipuri).

According to the "Guide to the gods" by Marjorie Leach, the term "Nongmaiching" is defined as "A hill god of the Meitheis, Manipur, Assam, India. (Hodson, 1908: 111)".

History 

In the history of Ancient Kangleipak (early Manipur), the three out of the seven clans of Meitei ethnicity, namely the Mangang, the Luwang and the Angom are historically associated with the Nongmaiching.

Meitei King Konthouba defeated many tribal chiefs and controlled their villages of Shelloi (Selloi) and Longmai (Langmai), near the present day Nongmaiching.

Geography 
The Nongmaiching lies to the eastern side of Imphal city. It separates Thoubal valley from that of the Iril River and the Imphal River. The Nongmaiching is close to the Andro, Imphal East.

Religious associations 

The Nongmaiching is a holy pilgrimage site for the Meitei people.
In Meitei religion (Sanamahism), the Nongmaiching is deeply associated with God Lainingthou Sanamahi and God Pakhangba. According to one legend, King Kangba kept an idol of God Sanamahi at a cave in the Nongmaiching.

The Nongmaiching is historically, mythologically and religiously associated with God Langmai Ningthou and Goddess Panthoibi.
This is mentioned in the Panthoibi Khongul, an ancient Meitei text. 

The Nongmaiching is the place where the Lai Haraoba was celebrated by the divine beings, after which it was imitated by the humans. 

"Kanglei Haraoba", one of the major types of the Lai Haraoba ceremonial ritualistic festival, is associated with the Nongmaiching.
As a part of the Lai Haraoba, the Kangleithokpa ritual was performed at the Nongmaiching. It represents the marriage of God Khoriphaba.

The Nongmaiching is the place where the final prayers for the worship ceremony associated with the three ancient Meitei deities, namely Pakhangba, Nongshaba and Yumjao Lairembi, are done. 

The Loiyumba Shinyen Constitution mentions that the "Salam" family of Meitei ethnicity used to idolise the Langmai Ching (Nongmaiching mountain) and to act the role of God Nongpok Ningthou. 
The same text mentions that the "Nongmaithem" clan of Meitei ethnicity used to glorify the Langmai Ching (Nongmaiching).

University of Sanamahi Culture 

The University of Sanamahi Culture (Sanamahi Culture University) is a university under construction in the Nongmaiching Ching. It is deeply associated with the Sanamahi Kiyong shrine. The university aims to teach the future generations of people about the ancient Meitei culture of the Sanamahi religion. It will offer its students various subjects about indigenous art forms, dance forms, music, Thang-Ta and Sagol Kangjei etc.

World War II 
During World War II, when there was an active combat between the troops of the United Kingdom and Japan in Manipur and other Northeast Indian states, the Nongmaiching serves as the most strategically important point in Imphal Valley.

Deforestation and forestation

Ecotourism development 
The Nongmaiching is one of the important hills and mountains in Manipur that have the strong potential for ecotourism development.

Reserve Forest 

There is a reserved forest in the Nongmaiching.

Santhei Natural Park 
The Santhei Natural Park located in the Santhei village of Andro, Imphal East, is at the foothills of the Nongmaiching. It is best known for its scenic natural beauty and serving as a picnic area.

Plant life 
The Nongmaiching is the natural habitat for various plant species, including Cymbopogon flexuosus and Goniothalamus sesquipedalis.

In popular culture 
 Saktam Machet Machet Mang Macha Macha: A 1999 Meitei language prose book by Kamal, Toijamba

 Thaloi Nungkhailon: A Meitei language astronomy and astrology book by Bhudhachandra, Yumnamcha

 Tingkhanglakta Gulap: A Meitei language poetry book by Kullachandra H

See also 
 Heingang Ching
 Marjing Polo Complex
 Marjing Polo Statue
 Kangla
 Kangla Nongpok Thong
 Kangla Nongpok Torban
 Mount Manipur
 Mount Manipur Memorial

Notes

References

External links 

 Nongmaiching Ching at Internet Archive
 Nongmaiching at 

Cultural heritage of India
Landforms of Manipur
Landmarks in India
Meitei culture
Meitei pilgrimage sites
Mountains in Sanamahism
Sacred mountains
Tourist attractions in India